Bathochromic shift (from Greek βαθύς bathys, "deep"; and χρῶμα chrōma, "color"; hence less common alternate spelling "bathychromic")  is a change of spectral band position in the absorption, reflectance, transmittance, or emission spectrum of a molecule to a longer wavelength (lower frequency). Because the red color in the visible spectrum has a longer wavelength than most other colors, the effect is also commonly called a red shift.

Hypsochromic shift is a change to shorter wavelength (higher frequency).

Conditions
It can occur because of a change in environmental conditions: for example, a change in solvent polarity will result in solvatochromism.

A series of structurally-related molecules in a substitution series can also show a bathochromic shift. Bathochromic shift is a phenomenon seen in molecular spectra, not atomic spectra; it is thus more common to speak of the movement of the peaks in the spectrum rather than lines.

 where  is the wavelength of the spectral peak of interest and

Detection
Bathochromic shift is typically demonstrated using a spectrophotometer, colorimeter, or spectroradiometer.

See also
Chromism
Solvatochromism
Spectroscopy

References

Chromism
Spectroscopy